Infiltrate & Corrupt! is a various artists compilation album released on March 24, 1997, by COP International.

Reception
Sonic Boom  called "Infiltrate & Corrupt" is an excellent cross section of the COP International roster for anyone interested in sounds of their current roster. The critic went on to praise the new bands Urania and Imbue, both formerly Under the Noise, for "exhibit[ing] a fresh new sound while still containing a few old roots that made their previous band so successful."

Track listing

Personnel
Adapted from the Infiltrate & Corrupt! liner notes.

 Stefan Noltemeyer – mastering
 Christian Petke (as Count Zero) – compiling, design

Release history

References

External links 
 Infiltrate & Corrupt! at Discogs (list of releases)

1997 compilation albums
COP International compilation albums